Johann Georg Veit Engelhardt (November 12, 1791 – September 13, 1855), a German Protestant theologian.

Life
He was born at Neustadt-on-the-Aisch.
He and was educated at Erlangen, where he afterwards taught in the gymnasium (1817), and became professor of theology in the university (1821). During the years 1845, 1847 and 1848 was the representative of his university in the diet at Munich.

Works
His two great works were a Handbuch der Kirchengeschichte in 4 volumes (1833-1834), and a Dogmengeschichte in 2 volumes, (1839). Other works included a translation of the writings ascribed to Dionysius the Areopagite and Richard von St. Victor und Johannes Ruysbroek (referring to Richard of Saint Victor and John of Ruusbroec; 1838). He died at Erlangen on September 13, 1855.

Notes

References
 

1791 births
1855 deaths
19th-century German Protestant theologians
People from Erlangen
University of Erlangen-Nuremberg alumni
Academic staff of the University of Erlangen-Nuremberg
German male non-fiction writers
19th-century male writers